The 2015 North District Council election was held on 22 November 2015 to elect all 18 elected members to the 20-member North District Council of Hong Kong.

Overall election results
Before election:

Change in composition:

References

External links
 Election Results - Overall Results

2015 Hong Kong local elections